Acrodus (from  , 'high' and   'tooth') is an extinct genus of cartilaginous fish from the Permian to Paleocene periods. Acrodus anningiae was named by Louis Agassiz in honor of the pioneering English paleontologist Mary Anning.

Species

Acrodus acuminatus
Acrodus acutus
Acrodus alexandrae
Acrodus alpinus
Acrodus anningiae
Acrodus angustissimus
Acrodus braunii
Acrodus (Acronemus) bicarenatusAcrodus cuneocostatusAcrodus dolloiAcrodus falsusAcrodus flemingianusAcrodus gaillardotiAcrodus illingworthiAcrodus immarginatusAcrodus jaeckeliAcrodus kalasinensisAcrodus keuperinusAcrodus laevigatusAcrodus (Acrodonchus) lateralisAcrodus levisAcrodus microdusAcrodus (Acrodonchus) minimusAcrodus nitidusAcrodus nobilisAcrodus olsoniAcrodus oppenheimeriAcrodus orbicularisAcrodus oreodontusAcrodus pulvinatusAcrodus rugosusAcrodus salomoniAcrodus scaberAcrodus simplexAcrodus spitzbergensisAcrodus striatusAcrodus substriatusAcrodus sweetlacruzensisAcrodus undulatusAcrodus vermicularisAcrodus vermiformisAcrodus virgatusAcrodus wempliae''

Sources

References
Acrodus at Fossilworks 

Triassic sharks
Prehistoric fish of Europe
Paleogene fish
Fossil taxa described in 1837
Prehistoric fish of North America
Taxa named by Louis Agassiz